Michal Fukala (born 22 October 2000) is a Czech footballer who plays as a defender for Slovan Liberec.

References

Living people
2000 births
Czech footballers
Association football defenders
FK Frýdek-Místek players
FC Slovan Liberec players
Czech First League players
Czech Republic youth international footballers